Fort Morris was a British fort or blockhouse built during the French and Indian War, located at Liverpool, Nova Scotia.  The fort was located at present-day Fort Point Lighthouse, while a surrounding blockhouse was at the corner of Lawrence and Wolfe Streets. (In 1762, the blockhouse was occupied by Lieut. Jonathan Diman Ebenezer Dexter).  The fort was completed shortly after Liverpool was established and the Halifax Treaties were signed (1759-1760). The fort was a local militia five-gun earthwork battery. Fort Morris was named after Surveyor General Charles Morris, who designed the layout of the town. (The fort was built the same time as Fort Ellis and Fort Belcher.)

American Revolution 

In the 1770s, Liverpool was the second-largest settlement in Nova Scotia, after Halifax. Unlike Halifax, nearly everyone in Liverpool was a New England Planter. The town was at first sympathetic to the cause of the American Revolution, with outlying outports like Port Medway and Port Mouton almost continuously visited by American privateers, but after repeated attacks by American privateers on local shipping interests and one direct attack on the town itself, in the Battle off Liverpool, Nova Scotia (1778), Liverpool citizens turned against the rebellion. Simeon Perkins wrote a successful appeal to the authorities in Halifax, and on December 13, 1778 Capt. John Howard's company of the King's Orange Rangers arrived aboard the transport Hannah. The company consisted of Howard, 2 lieutenants, 1 ensign, 3 sergeants, 2 or 3 corporals, 48 privates, and several camp followers, both women and children. During the next year the men assisted the locals in re-building Fort Morris at what is today called Fort Point.

Upon arriving in Liverpool, six men deserted from Fort Point on February 9, 1779, stealing a boat and making for Port Mouton. This was the first of several such incidents. Relations with the townspeople were often strained due to petty thefts, break-ins of local stores, including Perkins', and suspicions of locals aiding deserters. At the same time, a number of KOR men married local women. As Liverpool began to outfit privateers of their own, Howard bought shares and agreed to have his men serve as marines on board.

After suffering three years of similar sporadic raids, the people of Liverpool, on June 2, 1779 built a battery for the artillery, rebuilt Fort Morris and on October 31 launched their own privateer vessel named Lucy to bring battle to their adversaries. As well, Perkins wrote a successful appeal to the authorities in Halifax, and on December 13, 1778 Capt. John Howard's company of the King's Orange Rangers arrived aboard the transport Hannah. The company consisted of Howard, 2 lieutenants, 1 ensign, 3 sergeants, 2 or 3 corporals, 48 privates, and several camp followers, both women and children.

Raid on Liverpool (1780) 
The most dramatic privateer raid occurred on September 13, 1780. Two American privateers, the Surprize under Cpt. Benjamin Cole, and the Delight, under Cpt. Lane, unloaded nearly 70 men at Ballast Cove shortly after midnight. By 4am they had captured the fort and taken Howard, two other officers, and all but six of the KOR garrison as prisoners. Perkins called out the militia, engineered the capture of Cole, and negotiated with Lane for the recovery of the fort and the release of the prisoners. Within a few hours "every thing [was] restored to its former Situation without any Blood Shed." Liverpool was not bothered by privateers for the remainder of the war. Most of Howard's company was ordered back to Halifax in mid-1781, but owing to appeals by the town's leaders, a detachment of 20 men under Lt. McLeod remained for the duration.

The fort was rebuilt during the War of 1812, when the five guns were replaced with three.

See also 
 Military history of Nova Scotia

References

Military history of Nova Scotia
Military forts in Nova Scotia
1761 establishments in Nova Scotia